Thomas Williams (August 11, 1825 – April 13, 1903) was a United States Representative from Alabama.

Williams was born near Richmond, Virginia.  He graduated from the University of East Tennessee in Knoxville. He was admitted to the Alabama bar in 1852 and began practicing law in Wetumpka, Alabama.

Williams held various minor public offices over the years, such as justice of the peace and register of chancery.  In 1872, he was appointed prison inspector. In 1878, he was a member of the Alabama House of Representatives. He was elected to the U.S. House of Representatives and served from March 4, 1879, to March 3, 1885.

After leaving office, Williams returned to Wetumpka and took up farming until his death at age 77 in Alabama .

References

External links

1825 births
1903 deaths
Democratic Party members of the United States House of Representatives from Alabama
University of Tennessee alumni
Democratic Party members of the Alabama House of Representatives
People from Wetumpka, Alabama
19th-century American politicians